MFU may refer to:

 Market facing unit, a synonym for line of business
 Ministry of Finance of Ukraine
 Midpeninsula Free University, United States
 Melbourne Free University, Australia
 Mae Fah Luang University, Thailand
 Milli flux unit, a synonym for a millijansky
 Mfuwe Airport, Zambia